Mor Gregorios Jacobite Students' Movement (MGJSM) is the student wing of Malankara Jacobite Syriac Orthodox Church. It is a Christian student organization in India. The Headquarter of MGJSM is located at Malankara Syrian Orthodox Theological Seminary  of Ernakulam District in Kerala.

History 
Founded in 1907 as "Syrian Students Conference", it is the first Student Christian Movement in India. It conducted annual conferences till 1912 on a regular basis. After the church split in 1912, the annual conferences were abandoned.

Later on 6 May 1922, a special convention of the Students of the Malankara Jacobite Syriac Orthodox Church was convened at the Cheruthottukunnel St. George Church of Angamaly diocese (in Pallikkara Region), under the initiative of St Paulose Mor Athanasius of Aluva (Valiya Thirumeni). In that meeting Thirumeni proposal of naming the organization after his spiritual mentor, St. Gregorios Geevarghese of Parumala was accepted. Thus 'Mar Gregorios Syrian Vidhyarthi Sangam' (also called Mar Gregorios Syrian Students Association - M.G.S.S.A) came into existence as the student wing of Jacobite Church. This was the first ever student's organization that adopted the name of St. Gregorios of Parumala. The movement gained momentum after this conference and started conducting conferences annually. Units were established in every parish and educational institution with a minimum of 10 Jacobite students. Valiya Thirumeni nourished the organization into becoming the 'back bone' of Jacobite Church. By 1950 the movement had nearly 500 units and a total of nearly 20000 members. During this period most of the church leaders were alumni of MGSSA.

In 1960 MGSSA and St Thomas Syrian Students of Mertran Faction, as it merged with Jacobite Church, merged to form Mar Gregorios Orthodox Christian Student Movement Mgocsm. During this period the Students Movement showed exponential growth and is said to have nearly 700 units and more than 25000 members. But this 'Golden Era' was short lived and soon in 1972 both the churches split apart. MGOCSM under Malankara Orthodox Church and SOSMI (Syrian Orthodox Students Movement of India), the Student wing of Jacobite Church which was later renamed as JASSMI (Jacobite Syrian Students Movement of India) in 2002 when the church adopted a new constitution.

In the century year of Metropolitan Consecration of St Athanasius, the Holy Episcopal Synod of Jacobite Syrian Christian Church held at Puthencruz in the Month of June 2009 decided to the change the name of the Organisation as  MGJSM ( Mor Gregorios Jacobite Syrian Students Movement), in the name of St Gregorios of Parumala in whose name St Athanasiaus started the students movement in the church. The organization now has more than 250 units and 25000 members. Annual Leadership Camp named LUMINA has been conducted every year since 2011. The first Regional Office was inaugurated at St Mary's Jacobite Cathedral, Morakkala for Pallikkara Region. H G Kuriakose Theophilose Metropolitan has been leading this rapid growth of MGJSM from 2009 onwards. Spiritual leaders like Fr Bobby, Fr George, Fr Elias, Fr Tijo, Dn Anish, Fr Thomas have made their contributions through the years.

Leadership 
MGJSM Officebearers from 2009

Wings

Regions

Kerala

Activities

Camps

Lumina 
The annual three-day camp held at MSOT Seminary. The first version was in 2011. Lumina has become the most watched out event of any Student Christian Organisations in India, due to its rapidly increasing number of participants.

Regional camps 
Different regions conduct 1 or 2 days camps for the members of that region like  EDIFY by Pallikkara Region and Annual Camp by Kothamangalam Region.

VIBGYOR 
This is an Inter Regional Conference of MGJSM.Initially it had 7 Regions-namely Pallikkara, Kochi City, Angamaly, Kolencherry,Koothattukulam, Perumbavoor, Kothamangalam-thus causing the name VIBGYOR. Later more Regions were added.

Cultural programs 
MGJSM conducts cultural programs at Regional and Unit levels
Christmas Celebration like Jingle Bells  by Muvattupuzha Region and Yule by Pallikkara Region.

Competitions 
MGJSM conducts arts and sports competition for its members notable being VANQUISH by Pallikkara Region

Charity work 
 Educational Aid
 Educational Instruments Distribution
 Aid to people in hazard stricken areas

Awards 
Awards and prices are given to Best Units, Regions and also members who have excelled in academic,sports,social and arts fields.
 Best Region Award
 Best Unit Award
 Proficiency Prizes
 Scholarship
 

Jacobite Syrian Christian Church
Student organizations established in 1922